Dean Slayton is a former American football coach. He was the 13th head football coach at Howard Payne University in Brownwood, Texas, serving for seven seasons, from 1972 to 1978, compiling a record of 28–42–2. After leaving Howard Payne in 1979, Slayton became an assistant coach at North Texas State University—now known as University of North Texas—under head coach Jerry Moore.  He followed Moore to Texas Tech University in 1981 and remained there as an assistant coach for 16 seasons.

Head coaching record

References

Year of birth missing (living people)
Living people
Howard Payne Yellow Jackets football coaches
North Texas Mean Green football coaches
Texas Tech Red Raiders football coaches
Tulsa Golden Hurricane football coaches
Tulsa Golden Hurricane football players
Tyler Apaches football players
UTEP Miners football coaches
High school football coaches in Oklahoma
High school football coaches in Texas